Chalk Mountains  may refer to:
 Chalk Mountains (California) in Humboldt County, California, USA
 Chalk Mountains (Colorado) in Archuleta County, Colorado, USA
 Chalk Mountains (Texas) in Brewster County, Texas, USA

See also
 Chalk Hills in Los Angeles, California, USA
 Chalk Buttes in Kings County, California, USA